HD 79940 is a single star in the southern constellation of Vela. It has the Bayer designation of k Velorum; HD 79940 is the identifier from the Henry Draper Catalogue. This star has a yellow-white hue and is faintly visible to the naked eye as a point light source with an apparent visual magnitude of 4.63. It is located at a distance of approximately 158 light-years from the Sun based on parallax, and is drifting further away with a radial velocity of +6 km/s.

There has been some disagreement over the stellar classification of this star. In 1975, S. Maladora found a class of F5III, suggesting an evolved F-type star, matching an earlier (1957) classification by A. de Vaucouleurs. N. Houk assigned it a class of F3/5V in 1979, matching an F-type main-sequence star. This may explain why it was incorrectly classified as a spectroscopic binary in 1972.

There is a faint magnitude 14.50 companion at an angular separation of  along a position angle of 126° from the brighter star. This was discovered by T. J. J. See in 1897.

References

F-type giants
F-type main-sequence stars
Vela (constellation)
Velorum, k
Durchmusterung objects
Gliese and GJ objects
079940
045448
3684